Hastula strigilata, common name the strigate auger, the strigillate auger or the combed auger, is a species of sea snail, a marine gastropod mollusc in the family Terebridae, the auger snails.

Description
The length of the shell varies between 18 mm and 56 mm.

Distribution
This species occurs in the Red Sea, the Arabian Sea, in the Indian Ocean off Madagascar, Chagos and the Mascarene Basin; in the Pacific off Hawaii and French Polynesia.

References

 Link D.H.F. (1807) Beschreibung der Naturalien-Sammlung der Universität zu Rostock. 3 Abt. [3 parts]. Rostock, Adlers Erben. 166 pp. page(s): 129 
 Bratcher T. & Cernohorsky W.O. (1987). Living terebras of the world. A monograph of the recent Terebridae of the world. American Malacologists, Melbourne, Florida & Burlington, Massachusetts. 240pp.
 Steyn, D.G & Lussi, M. (2005). Offshore Shells of Southern Africa: A pictorial guide to more than 750 Gastropods. Published by the authors. Pp. i–vi, 1–289.
 Terryn Y. (2007). Terebridae: A Collectors Guide. Conchbooks & NaturalArt. 59pp + plates
  Liu, J.Y. [Ruiyu] (ed.). (2008). Checklist of marine biota of China seas. China Science Press. 1267 pp
 Severns M. (2011) Shells of the Hawaiian Islands - The Sea Shells. Conchbooks, Hackenheim. 564 pp
 Castelin M., Puillandre N., Kantor Yu. I., Modica M.V., Terryn Y., Cruaud C., Bouchet P. & Holford M. (2012) Macroevolution of venom apparatus innovations in auger snails (Gastropoda; Conoidea; Terebridae). Molecular Phylogenetics and Evolution 64: 21–44
 Terryn Y. (2018). A new species of Hastula from Negros, Philippines. Xenophora Taxonomy. 22: 19-21

External links
 Linnaeus, C. (1758). Systema Naturae per regna tria naturae, secundum classes, ordines, genera, species, cum characteribus, differentiis, synonymis, locis. Editio decima, reformata [10th revised edition, vol. 1: 824 pp. Laurentius Salvius: Holmiae.]
 Deshayes G.P. (1859). A general review of the genus Terebra, and a description of new species. Proceedings of the Zoological Society of London. 27: 270-321.
 Noodt, J. (1819). Museum Boltenianum: Verzeichnis der von dem gestorbenen J. F. Bolten... hinterlassenen vortrefflichen Sammlung Conchylien, Mineralien und Kunstsachen die am 26. April d.J., Morgens um 10 Uhr öffentlich verkauft werden sollen durch den Makler J. Noodt. Conrad Müller, Hamburg, pp. vi + 156, 4 pls
 Fedosov, A. E.; Malcolm, G.; Terryn, Y.; Gorson, J.; Modica, M. V.; Holford, M.; Puillandre, N. (2020). Phylogenetic classification of the family Terebridae (Neogastropoda: Conoidea). Journal of Molluscan Studies. 85(4): 359-388
 Smithsonian Institution: the combed auger

Terebridae
Gastropods described in 1758
Taxa named by Carl Linnaeus